Soundscape of Silence is the fifth album released by the Finnish band Before the Dawn. It was released on 31 October 2008, through Stay Heavy Records. During the recording sessions of this album in early 2008, the band had to cope with yet another line-up change – once again, the drum-seat became vacant. The core crew of Before the Dawn (Tuomas, Lars, Juho) only took some time off from studio to play at summer festivals like the Wacken Open Air in Germany, mainly with the aid of session drummer Matti Auerkallio, later replaced by Agonizer's Atte Palokangas. In summer 2009 Atte became an official band member.

Background
Coinciding with the band's 10th anniversary, Before the Dawn accompanied Amorphis on their Forging Europe Tour in autumn 2009; in 2010 they played more club and festival shows all over Europe and also visited Asia (China and Japan in May, Russia in September).

Track listing

Charts

References

External links
 Before the Dawn official website Media page

2008 albums
Before the Dawn (band) albums